Alpine skiing at the 2014 Winter Paralympics was held at the Rosa Khutor Alpine Resort near Krasnaya Polyana, Russia. The thirty-two events occurred on 8–16 March 2014.

Events

Snowboarding made its Paralympic debut with the addition of men's and women's standing snowboard cross events to the alpine skiing program.

The competition events are:

Downhill (sitting, standing, visually impaired): women – men
Super-G (sitting, standing, visually impaired): women – men
Giant slalom (sitting, standing, visually impaired): women – men
Slalom (sitting, standing, visually impaired): women – men
Super combined (sitting, standing, visually impaired): women – men
Snowboard cross (standing): women – men

Competition schedule
The following is the competition schedule for all thirty-two events.

All times are (UTC+4).

Medal summary

Medal table

Women's events

Men's events

See also
Alpine skiing at the 2014 Winter Olympics

References

 
2014 Winter Paralympics
2014 Winter Paralympics events
Paralympics